This is a list of notable Rohingya people.

Politicians and activists

Others 
 Abu Dhar Azzam
 Ataullah abu Ammar Jununi, leader of the Arakan Rohingya Salvation Army
 Mohammad Hanif, creator of the Hanifi Rohingya script

Lists of people by ethnicity